Ribeira Grande is a concelho (municipality) of Cape Verde. Situated in the northern part of the island of Santo Antão, it covers one fifth of the island area (166.5 km2), and is home to nearly half of its population (18,890 at the 2010 census). Its seat is the city Ponta do Sol.

Subdivisions
The municipality consists of four freguesias (civil parishes):
Nossa Senhora do Rosário
Nossa Senhora do Livramento
Santo Crucifixo
São Pedro Apóstolo

Demography

Geography
The municipality has a rugged landscape, stretching from the mountains in the interior of the island to the north coast. It has several deep river valleys, including those of Ribeira da Garça, Ribeira Grande and Ribeira da Torre. It borders the municipality Paul to the east and Porto Novo to the south. The protected areas Cova-Paul-Ribeira da Torre Natural Park, Moroços and Cruzinha lie (partly) within the municipality..

History
In 1732 the Municipality of Santo Antão was created, with its seat in the town Ribeira Grande. In 1867 this was divided into the municipality of Paul (covering the area of current Paul and Porto Novo) and the municipality of Ribeira Grande. These were merged in 1895 into one municipality. The municipalities of Paul and Ribeira Grande were recreated in 1917.

Politics
Since 2008, the Movement for Democracy (MpD) is the ruling party of the municipality. Its current president is Orlando Delgado (MpD). The results of the latest elections, in 2016:

Persons
António do Espírito Santo Fonseca, president of the National Assembly from 1996 to 2001
Gabriel Mariano, Capeverdean essayist, novelist & poet
Manuel de Novas, Capeverdean poet

Twin towns

Torres Novas, Portugal
Ponta do Sol, Madeira Islands

References

External links
 Official website 
 ANMCV (Associação Nacional dos Municípios Cabo-Verdianos - National Association of the Capeverdean Municipalities)

Other articles
Interview with the president of the Municipal Council of Ribeira Grande Orlando Delgado - Olhos de Zepra 

 
Municipalities of Cape Verde
Geography of Santo Antão, Cape Verde